Ronald Frederick Abbott (born 2 August 1953) is an English former professional footballer who played in the Football League as a defender for Queens Park Rangers. He later played for Irish club Drogheda United and in English non-league football for Fisher Athletic.

References

1953 births
Living people
Footballers from Lambeth
English footballers
Association football defenders
Queens Park Rangers F.C. players
Drogheda United F.C. players
Fisher Athletic F.C. players
English Football League players